Mikhail Aleksandrovich Pimenov (born 19 September 1983) is a former Russian professional footballer.

Club career
He made his professional debut in the Russian Second Division in 2002 for FC Mostransgaz Gazoprovod.

He made his Russian Football National League debut for FC KAMAZ Naberezhnye Chelny on 28 March 2007 in a game against FC Spartak-MZhK Ryazan.

References

1983 births
Footballers from Moscow
Living people
Russian footballers
FC KAMAZ Naberezhnye Chelny players
FC Volga Nizhny Novgorod players
FC Tyumen players
FC Mostransgaz Gazoprovod players
Association football midfielders
FC Spartak Moscow players
FC Shinnik Yaroslavl players
FC Izhevsk players